Zhang Ying (born 12 February 1988) is a Chinese group rhythmic gymnast. She represented her nation at international competitions.

She competed at the 2005 World Rhythmic Gymnastics Championships.

References

Chinese rhythmic gymnasts
1988 births
Living people
Place of birth missing (living people)
21st-century Chinese women